The list contains the names of cities, districts, and neighborhoods in the U.S. that are predominantly African American or that are strongly associated with African-American culture— either currently or historically. Included are areas that contain high concentrations of blacks or African Americans.  Not counted are Afro-Caribbeans, Afro-Latinos, Afro-Asian, Afro-Indian, Afro-Polynesian, West African, and Sub-Saharan African immigrants.

The largest African-American community is in Atlanta, Georgia; followed by Washington, DC; Houston, Texas; Chicago, Illinois; Miami, Florida; and Detroit, Michigan. About 80 percent of the city population is African-American. A quarter of Metro Detroit (Macomb, Oakland and Wayne counties) are African-American.

Neighborhoods and Master Planned Communities

Alabama
Birmingham
 16th Street
 East Thomas
 Ensley
 North Birmingham
 Smithfield
 Titusville

Black Belt of Alabama – 18 counties in Alabama, a total of 52% African-American population.

Hobson City

Mobile
 Dauphin Square
 Leinkauf

Montgomery

Prichard

Skyline

White Hall

Alaska
Anchorage

Fairbanks

Arizona

Arcadia, Maricopa County, Phoenix and Scottsdale, Arizona
Catalina Foothills, Tucson, Pima County, Arizona
Cave Creek, Maricopa County
Chandler ,  Maricopa County Southeast of Phoenix, next to Gilbert
Dunbar Spring Tucson, Pima County, Arizona
Fountain Hills Maricopa County, Greater Phoenix Metro and Scottsdale
Gilbert, Maricopa County
Glendale, Maricopa County
Goodyear, Maricopa County
Marana, Pima County, Northwest of Tucson
Paradise Valley Maricopa County
Maryvale Phoenix
Mesa, Maricopa County, between Gilbert and Scottsdale, Arizona
Oro Valley Pima County, Arizona
Queen Creek Maricopa County and Pinal County
Randolph  Pinal County
Scottsdale Maricopa County
Tempe, Maricopa County, Arizona

Arkansas

Altheimer

Conway

Cross Roads, Arkansas

Dumas

Gould

Grady

Helena and West Helena

Jonesboro

Lake Village

Little Rock
East Little Rock
Southwest

Pine Bluff

Stuttgart

West Memphis

California
Allensworth in Tulare County (historical)

West Anaheim – formerly Manchester Avenue. Now along Magnolia Street. 

Antelope Valley

Avenal

Bakersfield
 Lakeview
 Oleander/Sunset 
 Southwest Bakersfield

Berkeley
 Lorin District
 South Berkeley
 West Berkeley

Blacks Beach, Santa Monica (historic).

Bruce's Beach, Manhattan Beach (historic).

California City

Chowchilla

Woodland Park, Chula Vista

Corcoran

East Palo Alto – one of Silicon Valley's largest Black percentage cities, declined from a Black majority or plurality in 1970s and 1980s (17% from 2010)

Emeryville

Fairfield 
 Tolenas

Folsom (historic Negro Bar).

Fresno 
 Edison (Southwest Fresno)

Hayward – communities found in Jackson Triangle, North Hayward, and Upper B Street areas.

Hercules
Lake Elsinore – Yarborough neighborhood of Old Town. Riverside County – goes back to the 1880s when the city incorporated (historic).

Long Beach
 Davenport Park
 Eastside
 North
 Ramona Park
 Westside

Los Angeles
 Adams Lake (decreasingly black).
 Adams-Normandie
 Baldwin Hills (some in unincorporated county area) 
 Bronzeville (historic)
 Chesterfield Square
 Crenshaw
 Exposition Park
 Gramercy Park
 Green Meadows
 Hyde Park
 Jefferson Park
 Lafayette Square
 Lake View Terrace
 Leimert Park
 Manchester Square
 Mid City
 Normandie Gardens (Southwest Los Angeles)
 Pico-Union (historic, no longer very black) 
 South of Interstate 10 in South L.A. (historic, now abandoned, called "Ghost Town")
 South Central (Florence/Normandie intersection site of 1992 riot)
 Venice (Oakwood)
 Vermont Knolls
 Vermont Square
 Vermont Vista
 Victoria Park
 Village Green
 Watts
 West Adams
 Westchester

Los Angeles County
 Athens
 Bellflower
 Carson
 Compton (especially in Downtown Compton and Sunny Cove)
 "Freetown", Whittier
 Gardena
 Hawthorne
 Inglewood
 Crenshaw-Imperial
 Hollywood Park
 Morningside Park
 North Inglewood
 Ladera Heights
 Lake Los Angeles
 Lancaster
 Palmdale
 Paramount
 Pomona
 Sun Village
 View Park-Windsor Hills
 West Athens
 West Compton
 Westmont
 Willowbrook

Marin City

Mojave

Oakland
 Acorn Projects
 Beulah (historic district)
 Broadway Auto Row
 Brookfield Village
 Bushrod Park
 Campbell Village Court
 Cypress Hill or "the Tree" (more Mexican and Latino).
 Chabot Park 
 Cypress Village
 Dimond District
 Dogtown
 Downtown Oakland
 Eastmont
 East Oakland
 Elmhurst
 Ghost Town
 Golden Gate
 Havenscourt
 Lincoln Park/ Lincoln Square (more Chinese and Asian).
 Lockwood Gardens
 Longfellow
 Lower Bottoms
 Lower Oakland.
 Maxwell Park
 Millsmont
 North Oakland, which also includes Ethiopian and Eritrean American communities
 Ralph Bunche
 San Antonio
 Santa Fe
 Seminary
Sequoyah Heights 
 Sobrante Park
 West Oakland

Orange County
 Aliso Viejo Orange County, California
 Dana Point Orange County, California
 Irvine Orange County, California
 Laguna Beach Orange County, California
 Laguna Niguel Orange County, California
 Lake Forest Orange County, California
 Mission Viejo Orange County, California
 Newport Beach Balboa Peninsula, Newport Harbor, Orange County, California
 San Clemente Orange County, California
 Santa Ana Orange County, California
 Sky Valley Orange County, California
 Yorba Linda, Orange County, California

Orinda

Pasadena (esp southwest side and South Pasadena)

Pinole

Pittsburg

Richmond
 Fairmede-Hilltop
 Iron Triangle
 Parchester Village

Riverside –
 Blaine Park. 
 East Side Riverside – along University and Chicago Avenues.
 North End Riverside.
 Raincross Square – downtown.
 University City.
 University Heights.

Nearby cities:
 Blythe – (15% black)
 Crossley Tract, Palm Springs extends to Cathedral City.
 Desert Highland, Palm Springs.
 Desert Hot Springs.
 Dream Homes/Gateway, Cathedral City near Palm Springs.
 Mead Valley.
 Moreno Valley – (17% black).
 Nobles Ranch near Indio Fashion Mall, Indio.
 North End, Palm Springs.
 Perris – esp. near March Air Base.
 Section 14, Palm Springs (historic, abandoned in the 1960s).
 West Indio (Nairobi Village) (limited).

Sacramento
 Del Paso Heights
 Meadowview area.
 Natomas
 North Sacramento
 Oak Park

Nearby cities:
Elk Grove

San Bernardino area – 
 Downtown San Bernardino.
 Indian Springs, near Seccombe Lake Park.
 Mount Vernon Avenue.
 University District, San Bernardino (Kendall Farms and North Park).
 Waterman-North End. 
 West Side San Bernardino.

Nearby cities:
 Adelanto – 20.5% due to most leaving to San Bernardino County and the Victorville area.
 Alta Loma in Rancho Cucamonga.
 Barstow – concentrated in northeast Barstow along with Hispanics.
 Downtown Colton – among many Hispanics.
 Fontana – esp. north of Foothill Blvd.
 Highland.
 Muscoy – unincorporated.
 Rialto – esp. East side.
 Twentynine Palms near 29 Palms USMC Base.
 Victorville  – esp. Eagle Ranch.
 west side Rancho Cucamonga.

San Diego
 Broadway Heights
 Chollas View
 City Heights
 Emerald Hills
 Encanto
 Lincoln Park
 Mount Hope
 Mountain View
 North Park
 Skyline
 Southeast San Diego
 Valencia Park
San Diego area-
 Calipatria
 Imperial
 Lemon Grove
 Oceanside (over 5%, Camp Pendleton).

San Francisco
 Bayview-Hunters Point
 Fillmore District
 India Basin
 Ocean View
 Potrero Terrace
 Sunnydale
 Western Addition

San Jose 
 Alameda Street (gentrified in the 2000s).
 Almaden – formerly black area. 
 Autumn Street/West Side (historic, no longer mostly black).
 Burbank, Santa Clara County, California/ Burbank District in San Jose.
 Northwest side – has the historic Coachella Valley Church.

Bristol Street, McFadden Avenue, Raitt Street and Santa Ana Boulevard in Santa Ana

Santa Rosa - South Park (historic), and Black/Eritrean communities in Northcoast Street/Piner Road area

Seaside

Stockton
 Downtown Stockton
 Kentfield 
 Weberstown

Suisun City (20%) – Solano County.

Susanville

Tehachapi

Vallejo 
 North Vallejo
 South Vallejo
 West Vallejo

Val Verde resort (historic).

Weed
 Lincoln Heights (mostly burned down in September 2022 fire; parts of Weed have some Black residents but fewer compared to mid-20th century when most of the Black community worked on the railroads). 

Mono Lake and nearby Bishop, Mammoth Lakes and Round Valley developed large Black percentages near the NV state line. Blythe, Big River, Havasu and Needles near the AZ state line. And towards Oregon (Siskiyou county) and the Mexican border (Imperial valley)

Colorado
Aurora

Colorado Springs
Southeast Colorado Springs

Denver
 East Denver
 Five Points 
 Montbello
 North Park Hill
 Northeast Park Hill

Fountain

San Miguel County
Norwood

Connecticut
Bloomfield

Blue Hills

Bridgeport

Capaco

Danbury

North End, Hartford

Middletown

New Haven
 Hill
 Newhallville
 Fair Haven
 Beaver Hills

New London

Norwalk

Stamford

Waterbury

District of Columbia
(Washington, D.C.)

Peaking at 75% black in the mid-1970s after five previous decades of the Great Migration increased the black population five-fold, DC is 46–49% black in 2018. DC remains the largest African-American percentage population of any state or territory in the mainland US. 

 Adams Morgan
 Anacostia
 Arboretum
 Barry Farm
 Barney Circle
 Bellevue
 Benning
 Benning Ridge
 Brentwood
 Buena Vista
 Burrville
 Capitol Hill
 Carver Langston
 Central Northeast
 Civic Betterment
 Cleveland Park
 Congress Heights
 Deanwood
 Douglass
 Dupont Park
 Eastland Gardens
 Eckington
 Edgewood
 Fairfax Village
 Fairlawn
 Foggy Bottom
 Fort Davis
 Fort Dupont
 Fort Lincoln
 Garfield Heights
 Good Hope
 Greenway
 Hillbrook
 Hillcrest
 Ivy City
 Kenilworth
 Kingman Park
 Knox Hill
 Langdon
 Lincoln Heights
 Logan Circle
 Marshall Heights
 Mayfair
 Michigan Park
 Mount Pleasant
 Naylor Gardens
 North Michigan Park
 Northwest side (closer to Mount Pleasant)
 Penn Branch
 Petworth
 Randle Highlands
 River Terrace
 Riggs Park
 Shaw
 Shipley Terrace
 Skyland
 The Strivers' Section
 Sursum Corda
 Trinidad, Washington, D.C.
 Twining
 U Street Corridor
 Washington Highlands
 Woodland
 Woodridge

Florida

Angola

Collier County
Ave Maria
Ave Maria

East Dunbar, Fort Myers

Fort Lauderdale
 Deepside
 Franklin Park
 Golden Heights
 Washington Park

Gretna

Hillsborough County
 Lutz, Florida
 New Tampa, Florida
 Riverview, Florida
 Ruskin, Florida
 Tampa
 Carver City-Lincoln Gardens, Tampa
 Central Tampa
 College Hill
 East Tampa, Florida
* New Tampa, Florida
 West Tampa
 Valrico, Florida
 Westchase, Florida
 Wimauma, Florida

Jacksonville
 Brooklyn
 LaVilla

Lee County
 Bonita Springs
 Cape Coral
 Fort Myers

Miami and Miami-Dade County
 Brownsville
 Carol City
 Coconut Grove
 Goulds
 Liberty City
 Little Haiti
 Miami Gardens
 Model City 
 Opa-locka
 Overtown
 Richmond Heights
 West Perrine

Orange County
 Eatonville - highest percentage in FL.
 Orlando (Central section).
 Parramore, Orlando
 Pine Hills
 Tangelo

Newtown, Palatka

Kendall Green, Pompano Beach

Palm Beach County
Belle Glade
Pahokee
West Palm Beach

Pasco County
 Wesley Chapel

Polk County
 Moorehead, now the site of RP Funding Center
 Webster Park

Prospect Bluff Historic Sites

Riviera Beach

Rosewood (historic)

Fort Mose Historic State Park, St. Augustine

Sanford

Sea Islands (northern coast), home to the Gullah and Geechee peoples (African creoles).

South Bay

Frenchtown, Tallahassee

St. Johns County
St. Augustine

Carver Ranches, West Park

Georgia
Atlanta - majority African-American. 
 Adamsville
 Bankhead
 Ben Hill
 Camilla
 Cascade Heights
 College Park
 Collier Heights
 Conyers
 Covington
 Decatur - 
 Dublin
 Duluth (20.2%)
 East Point
 Fairburn
 Fort Valley
 Fulton County
 Gainesville
 Sandy Springs
 Kirkwood
 Lawrenceville
 Louisville
 Mableton
 Macon
 Marietta
 Mechanicsville
 Morrow
 Newnan (30.6%)
 Old Fourth Ward
 Palmetto (56.9%)
 Peachtree Corners (23.3%)
 Powder Springs
 Riverdale
 Russell
 Sandtown
 Smyrna
 Southwestern Atlanta 
 Summerhill
 Sweet Auburn
 Union City
 Warner Robins
 Washington Park
 West End

Albany

Augusta

Bellevue, Macon

Cairo

Clayton County
 Jonesboro
 Morrow

Douglasville

Hancock County

Hinesville

Jefferson County

Lithonia

Macon

Savannah

Sea Islands (southern coast), home to the Gullah and Geechee peoples (African creoles).

Stewart County

Stone Mountain
Downtown
Redan
Stephenson

Talbot County

Idaho
 Mountain Home near Mountain Home AFB.
 Boise

Illinois
Cairo

Chicago
 South Side
 Ashburn
 Auburn Gresham
 Avalon Park
 Bronzeville
 Burnside
 Calumet Heights
 Chatham
 Chicago Lawn
 Douglas
 Englewood
 Fuller Park
 Grand Boulevard
 Greater Grand Crossing
 Hyde Park 
 Kenwood
 Morgan Park
 Near South Side 
 New City
 Oakland
 Pullman
 Riverdale
 Roseland
 South Chicago
 South Deering
 South Shore
 Washington Heights
 Washington Park
 West Englewood
 West Pullman
 Woodlawn
 West Side
 Austin
 East Garfield Park
 Humboldt Park
 Near West Side
 North Lawndale
 West Garfield Park
 North Side
 Cabrini Green
 Suburbs
 Bellwood
 Broadview
 Burnham
 Calumet City
 Calumet Park
 Chicago Heights 
 Country Club Hills
 Dixmoor
 Dolton
 East Hazel Crest
 Flossmoor
 Ford Heights
 Glenwood
 Harvey
 Hazel Crest
 Hillside
 Homewood 
 Lansing
 Lynwood
 Markham
 Matteson
 Maywood
 Olympia Fields
 Park Forest
 Phoenix
 Richton Park
 Riverdale
 Robbins
 Sauk Village
 South Holland 
 University Park

Joliet
 Forest Park
 Preston Heights

Kankakee County
 Hopkins Park
 Sun River Terrace

Peoria
 West Peoria

Pulaski County

St. Clair County
 Brooklyn
 Cahokia Heights
 East St. Louis
 Washington Park

Indiana
Gary
 Downtown
 Ambridge Mann
 Brunswick
 Downtown West
 Tolleston
 Glen Park 
 Midtown 
 Aetna
 Emerson
 Miller Beach

Indianapolis
 Avondale Meadows
 Bridgeport (Sunnyside/West Parkview) (historic)
 Crooked Creek
 Devington
 Haughville
 Indiana Avenue (historic)
 Flanner House Homes
 Lockefield Gardens
 Ransom Place Historic District
 Martindale–Brightwood
 Norwood
 United Northwest Area
 Northwest–Riverside

Merrillville

Washington Township, Randolph County (outside Lynn – 1% while it's higher outside Lynn)

Iowa
Cedar Rapids

Des Moines 
 Drake Park
 King-Irving Park
 Oak Ridge
 River Bend
 Sherman Hill

Quad Cities area
 Davenport

Saylorville

Kansas
Cherokee Township (Weir, Kansas)

Dodge City

Kansas City, Kansas

Morton City, Kansas ("Exoduster" historic site)

Wichita 
 Fairmount
 Ken-Mar
 Matlock Heights
 McAdams, Wichita, Kansas
 North Central
 Northeast Heights
 Northeast Millair

Junction City

Kentucky
Lexington
 Elkhorn Park
 Idle Hour - Idle Hour Country Club (10+%)
 Winburn

Louisville
 Algonquin
 Berrytown
 California
 Chickasaw
 Hallmark
 Jacobs
 Limerick
 Newburg
 Old Louisville
 Park DuValle
 Park Hill
 Parkland
 Petersburg
 Phoenix Hill
 Poplar Hills
 Russell
 Shawnee
 Shelby Park
 Shively
 Smoketown

Paducah – While the city itself is about 25% African American, the city school district's high school is about 50% African American.

Russellville
 Black Bottom

Louisiana
Acadiana region in Louisiana has several historically African-American majority towns.

Alexandria

Bastrop

Baton Rouge

Black Belt of Louisiana - Bobtown, Mossville, St. Maurice and Washington.

Donaldsonville

Edgar

Grambling

Jeanerette

Lafayette

Lake Charles

Mississippi Delta region.

Monroe

Natchitoches

New Orleans
 Black Pearl
 Central City
 Desire Area
 Dixon
 Florida Area
 Gert Town
 Hollygrove
 Holy Cross
 Lower 9th Ward
 Marlyville
 Parts of Algiers
 Parts of Eastern New Orleans
 Pigeon Town
 Seventh Ward (neighborhood)
 St. Claude
 St. Roch
 Treme
 Tulane/Gravier

Opelousas

Shreveport

Tallulah

Wallace

Maine
Kennedy Park, Portland

Maryland
Anne Arundel County
 Jessup

Baltimore
 Ashburton
 Barclay
 Belair-Edison
 Berea
 Better Waverly
 Broadway East
 Brooklyn
 Cedonia
 Cherry Hill
 Coppin Heights
 East Baltimore Midway
 Edmondson Village
 Ednor Gardens-Lakeside
 Greenmount West
 Gwynn's Falls
 Johnston Square
 Jonestown
 McElderry Park
 Middle East
 Mid-Govans
 Mondawmin
 Mosher
 Oliver
 Pen Lucy
 Pimlico
 Rosemont
 Sandtown-Winchester
 Upton
 Waverly
 Wilson Park

Baltimore County
 Lochearn
 Milford Mill
 Owings Mills
 Randallstown
 Turners Station
 Woodlawn

Berry Road area (MD route 228).

Charles County
 Hughesville
 La Plata.
 Pomonkey
 Waldorf

Montgomery County
 Ken-Gar

Prince George's County
 Accokeek
 Bladensburg
 Camp Springs
 Capitol Heights
 Cheverly
 Chillum
 Clinton
 Coral Hills
 District Heights
 Eagle Harbor
 Fairmount
 Forest Heights
 Forestville
 Fort Washington
 Friendly
 Glenarden
 Glenn Dale
 Greenbelt
 Hillcrest Heights
 Kettering
 Lake Arbor
 Largo
 Laurel
 Marlow Heights
 Marlton
 Mitchellville
 New Carrollton
 North Brentwood
 Rosaryville
 Seat Pleasant
 South Laurel
 Springdale
 Suitland
 Temple Hills
 Upper Marlboro
 Walker Mill
 Woodlawn
 Woodmore

Ridge near St. Inigoes

St. Mary's County

Somerset County
 Princess Anne

Massachusetts
Boston
 Beacon Hill (historically)
 Dorchester
 Dot-west (West Dorchester)
 Hyde Park
 Jamaica Plain
 Mattapan
 Roxbury
 Blue Hill Avenue
 South Boston (site of 1975 racial conflicts in integration of a high school).
 West End (also had Latinos, Italians and Jews, and Irish).

Other places in MA
Beverly Massachusetts
Brockton Massachusetts
Brookline Massachusetts
Cambridge Massachusetts
Chestnut Hill Massachusetts
Concord Massachusetts
Everett Massachusetts 
Lexington  Massachusetts
Leverett  Massachusetts
Longmeadow Massachusetts
Lowell Massachusetts, aka "Mill City".
Lynn Massachusetts.
Marblehead Massachusetts
Malden Massachusetts.
Medford Massachusetts.
New Bedford Massachusetts (New Bedford has many Portuguese, Cape Verdeans and Angolans).
Newburyport Massachusetts
Newton Massachusetts
Oak Bluffs Massachusetts|Oak Bluffs- (sizable affluent Black-African American community, esp. tourism and seasonal residences).
Provincetown Massachusetts
Randolph Massachusetts.
Sharon Massachusetts
Springfield Massachusetts (Springfield had a historic amateur black basketball team the Americans known to play against the Harlem Globetrotters who later became an entertainment team).
Sudbury Massachusetts
Waltham Massachusetts
Winchester Massachusetts
Wellesley Massachusetts
West Medford
Worcester
Belmont Street
Main South
Norrback Avenue
Plumley Village East Projects

Michigan
Bay City

Benton Harbor – site of 2003 riots

Beverly Hills

Birmingham

Bloomfield area-
 Bloomfield Village
 Charing Cross
 Circle
 Oak Grove

Bloomfield Hills
 
West Bloomfield 

Detroit
 Black Bottom
 Brightmoor
 Clark Park
 Conant Gardens
 Dexter-Linwood
 Downriver
 East Side
 "South" Side
 Southwest Side 
 West Side

Flint

Hamtramck
 
Highland Park

Inkster

Jackson

Kalamazoo

Lansing

Midland

Muskegon Heights

Pontiac

Saginaw

Southfield

Warren – est. 15–20%.

Minnesota
Minneapolis
 Jordan
 Hawthorne
 Near North
 Harrison
 Willard-Hay
 Cedar-Riverside
 Folwell
 McKinley
 Cleveland
 Phillips
 Powderhorn

Rochester
 River Court
 Sunnyside

Saint Paul

 Thomas-Dale
 Summit-University

Mississippi
Black Belt of Mississippi – Large African-American majority region.

Byhalia

Clarksdale - 68% black

Davis Bend, Mississippi/Louisiana.

Falcon – 98% black.

Russ College

Jackson
Georgetown
Queens-Magnolia Terrace
Shady Oaks
Stadium Side
Presidential Hills
Virden Addition
Washington Addition

University Park/Palisades

Leland - 2/3 of the town is black.

Mississippi Delta region.

Mound Bayou – 98% black.

Tougaloo

Yazoo City

Missouri
Charleston

Hayti Heights

Kansas City
 Hyde Park
 Hickman Mills
 Holmes Park
 Martin City
 Red Bridge
 Ruskin Heights

St. Louis
 North St. Louis (the West Walnut Manor area).
 Old North St. Louis
 Tower Grove South
 The Ville
 Walnut Park area of St. Louis

St. Louis County
 Berkeley
 Black Jack – 80% black.
 Calverton Park
 Castle Point
 Cool Valley
 Country Club Hills – 90% black
 Dellwood
 Ferguson (site of 2014 riot)
 Flordell Hills
 Jennings
 Kinloch
 Meacham Park
 Normandy
 Pine Lawn
 University City
 Woodstock

Nebraska
Bellevue

Lincoln

Omaha - most live in Northeast Omaha.
 Lexington

South Sioux City

Nevada

 Centennial Hills North Las Vegas, Clark County
 Enterprise South Las Vegas, Clark County 
 Green Valley South South Las Vegas, Clark County
 Henderson South Las Vegas, Clark County
 Lake Las Vegas South East Henderson, Las Vegas, Clark County
 MacDonald Ranch South East Las Vegas, Clark County
 Providence Las Vegas, North West Las Vegas, Clark County
 Skye Canyon North West Las Vegas, Clark County
 Southern Highlands South West Las Vegas, Clark County
 Spring Valley South West Las Vegas, Clark County
 Summerlin North West Las Vegas, Clark County
 The Lakes Las Vegas, Clark County
 Tulse Springs North Las Vegas, Clark County
 West Las Vegas
 North West Las Vegas -  Master Planned Communities (21% black)

New Jersey
 East Orange
 Hillside
 Irvington
 Paterson
 Bridgeton
 Jersey City
 Elizabeth
 New Brunswick
 Passaic
 Winslow
 Somerset
 Englewood
 Lindenwold
 Rahway
 Vineland
 Millville
 Linden
 Perth Amboy
 Teaneck
 Burlington
 Hackensack
 Pennsauken
 Vauxhall
 Long Branch
 Montclair
 Newark
 Weequahic
 Orange
 Plainfield
 Roselle
 Trenton
 Asbury Park
 Neptune
 Atlantic City
 Camden
 Chesilhurst
 Lawnside
 Pleasantville
 Salem
 Seabrook Farms
 Willingboro
 Whitesboro
 Ewing
 Collingswood
 Mount Holly
 Sicklerville
 Carteret
 Pemberton
 Galloway
 Deptford
 Lakewood
 Haddon Heights
 Springfield-Belmont
 Community Park, Princeton

New Mexico
Albuquerque
 Parts of Downtown Albuquerque 
 Kirtland Air Force Base 
 South Broadway (somewhat historical, but area still retains a visible African-American community)

Blackdom (historical; currently a ghost town)

Clovis (some areas)

Hobbs (some areas)

New York
Albany
 Arbor Hill
 Delaware Avenue Neighborhood
 Dudley Heights
 Groesbeckville
 Kenwood
 Mansion District
 North Albany
 The Pastures
 South End
 West Hill

Buffalo
 Cold Springs
 East Side
 Hamlin Park
 Kensington
 Schiller Park

Mount Vernon
Oakwood Heights
South Side
West Mount Vernon

Nassau County
 Baldwin
 Elmont
 Freeport
 Hempstead
 Lakeview
 New Cassel
 North Valley Stream
 Roosevelt
 South Floral Park
 Uniondale

New York City
 The Bronx:
 Allerton
 Baychester
 Co-op City
 Eastchester
 Edenwald
 Fordham
 Highbridge
 Morrisania
 Mott Haven
 Olinville
 Parkchester
 Soundview
 South Bronx
 Tremont
 Wakefield
 Williamsbridge
Brooklyn:
 Bedford-Stuyvesant
 Brownsville
 Bushwick
 Canarsie
 City Line
 Clinton Hill
 Crown Heights (site of 1991 riot)
 Cypress Hills
 East Flatbush
 East New York
 Flatbush
 Flatlands
 Fort Greene
 Ocean Hill
 Starrett City
 Stuyvesant Heights
 Weeksville
 Wingate
Manhattan:
 Hamilton Heights
 Harlem (the "Black Mecca" of African-American culture, esp 1920s–30s).
 San Juan Hill
 Seneca Village (destroyed when creating Central Park)
 Sugar Hill
Queens:
 Arverne
 Cambria Heights 
 East Elmhurst
 Elmhurst
 Far Rockaway
 Hollis
 Jamaica
 Laurelton
 Queensbridge
 Queens Village
 Rosedale
 St. Albans (including Addisleigh Park)
 South Jamaica
 Springfield Gardens
Staten Island:
 Clifton
 Mariners Harbor
 New Brighton
 Park Hill
 Stapleton
 Tompkinsville

Orange County
 Newburgh
 Middletown

Poughkeepsie (site of 1927 race riot)

Rochester
 19th Ward
 Plymouth-Exchange
 Genesee-Jefferson
 Corn Hill
 Group 14621
 Marketview Heights
 Beechwood
 Homestead Heights
 Edgerton

Rockland County
 Central Nyack
 Heritage Dr., New City
 Hillcrest
 Nyack
 Spring Valley

Suffolk County
 Wyandanch
 Gordon Heights
 North Bellport
 North Amityville
 Wheatley Heights

Syracuse
 Brighton
 Elmwood
 Near Eastside
 North Valley
 Salt Springs

Utica
 Cornhill

White Plains
Northwest White Plains
Fisher Hill, White Plains

Yonkers
 Runyon Heights
 Southwest Yonkers

North Carolina
Eastland, Charlotte

Hayti, Durham

Emorywoods Estate, Durham, North
Carolina

Elizabeth City

Goldsboro

Greensboro – 40.6% black, historic black city in the South since slavery, colonial times, Civil rights and the Civil war.

Henderson

James City

Kinston (62% black)

Crestdale Matthews Formerly Tank Town

Oxford

Princeville

Raleigh
East Raleigh–South Park Historic District – Largest African American neighborhood in Raleigh.
Madonna Acres Historic District, historic black district in Raleigh

Rocky Mount

Roxboro

Sedalia

Tarboro

Wadesboro

Williamston

Woodland (45/45% split black/white)

Ohio
Akron

Canton

Cincinnati
 Avondale
 Bond Hill
 College Hill
 East Westwood
 English Woods
 Evanston
 Kennedy Heights
 Madisonville
 Millvale
 Mount Airy
 North Avondale
 North Fairmount
 Over-the-Rhine
 Paddock Hills
 Pendleton
 Queensgate
 Roselawn
 South Cumminsville
 South Fairmount
 Spring Grove Village 
 Villages at Roll Hill
 West End
 Westwood
 Winton Hills

Cleveland
 Buckeye-Shaker
 Central
 Fairfax
 Glenville
 Hough
 Lee-Miles
 South Collinwood
 Woodland Hills
 Nearby Cuyahoga County
 Bedford Heights
 East Cleveland
 North Randall
 Warrensville Heights

Columbus
 Driving Park
 Mount Vernon
 Near East Side
 Berwick
 Far East
 Milo-Grogan
 Windsor Terrace
 Urbancrest

Dayton 
 Oregon District

East Jackson-Waverly

Newark

Springfield

Toledo 
North Park
South Side

Warren

Warrensville Heights

Youngstown
Downtown Youngstown
North Heights

Oklahoma

Oklahoma has a few surviving all-black or African-American majority towns as a result of the Land Rush of 1889, similar to the Exodusters after the Civil War (1860s) to nearby Kansas. One example is Freedom not to be confused with Freedom in the western half of the state.

"All-Black" settlements that were part of the Land Run of 1889.

 Boley. 
 Brooksville.
 Clearview.
 Grayson. 
 Lima.
 Red Bird.
 Rentiesville.
 Summit.
 Taft, facing Osage Nation and Cherokee Nation tribal areas (Black Cherokees). 
 Tatums.
 Tullahassee. 
 Vernon.

Among the Oklahoma Territory all Black towns no longer in existence are Lincoln, Cimarron City, Bailey, Zion, Emanuel, Udora, and Douglas.

Bristow – 10% Black

Eufaula

Langston

Oklahoma City
 Bricktown
 Deep Deuce
 Eastside, Oklahoma City
 Edwards Heights Historic District
 Northeast Oklahoma City
 Town of Forest Park
 Nearby Midwest City

Tahlequah East side

Tulsa – 15% black city
 East Side
 Greenwood, Tulsa ("Black wall street" in 1920s)
 Neighborhoods of Tulsa, Oklahoma#Northside – North Tulsa
 West Side (Downtown)

Turley – 20–25% Black

Oregon
Portland
 Alberta Arts District 
 Albina Street
 Boise
 Eliot
 Humboldt
 King
 Piedmont
 Vernon
 Woodlawn

Eugene
 Skinner Butte
 Glenwood
 West 11th Avenue Neighborhood

Pennsylvania
Philadelphia
 Allegheny West
 Cobbs Creek
 Eastwick
 Fern Rock
 Frankford
 Germantown
 Grays Ferry
 Haddington
 Hawthorne
 Mantua
 Mount Airy
 Nicetown-Tioga
 North Central
 Overbrook
 Olney
 Parkside
 Point Breeze
 Southwest Center City
 Strawberry Mansion
 University City – black plurality today.
 Walnut Hill
 West Philadelphia
 Wynnefield

Pittsburgh
City neighborhoods
 The Hill District
 Homewood
 Larimer
 Beltzhoover
 Manchester
 Hazelwood
 California-Kirkbride
 Arlington Heights
 St. Clair
 East Liberty
 Garfield
 Lincoln-Lemington-Belmar
 Perry South
 Fairywood
Suburbs
 Homestead
 Braddock
 Rankin
 Duquesne
 Wilkinsburg

Rhode Island
Pawtucket

Providence
 Federal Hill – developed sizable black population since the 1960s.
 Mount Hope
 South Providence

South Carolina
South Carolina is part of the Black Belt geological formation

Acabee

Allendale

Bennettsville

Charleston

Columbia
Waverly
Eastover

Greenville

Lake City

Marion

North Charleston

Orangeburg

Red Top

Ridgeland

Rock Hill (38.3%)

Sea Islands (South Carolina coast, home to the Gullah and Geechee peoples (African creoles).

Sumter (47.03%)

Tennessee
Chattanooga

Denmark

Dyersburg

Jackson

Knoxville

Memphis
 Beale Street (historic district)
 Orange Mound
 South Memphis
 Whitehaven
 North Memphis
 Hickory Hill
 Frayser
 Douglass
 Southwind
 Riverside
 Hollywood
 Hyde Park
 Binghampton
 Uptown
 Parkway Village

Nashville
 Cleveland Park
 Bordeaux, Tennessee
 Whites Creek
 North Nashville
 East Nashville
 East Davidson County
 Antioch
 Southeast Davidson
 Hermitage

Whiteville

Texas
Austin
Rosewood Park
Oak Springs
University Hills
Cavalier Park
11th Street
Loyola Lane
Johnny Morris
Oak Springs
Austin Colony
Springdale

Austin suburbs
Bastrop - Black population, 965 (9.96%) in 2020 Census
Shiloh
Hornsby Bend - Black population, 2,208 (18.15%) in 2020 Census
Hutto - Black population, 3,459 (12.54%) in 2020 Census
Pflugerville - Black population, 9,624 (14.76%) in 2020 Census
Round Rock - Black population, 11,552 (9.67%) in 2020 Census
Shenandoah
Wells Branch - Black population, 2,426 (17.33%) in 2020 Census
Windemere - Black population, 16.82% in 2010 Census

Beaumont-Port Arthur-Orange (Golden Triangle area)

Beaumont - Black population, 54,034 (46.87%) in 2020 Census
South Park
Port Arthur - Black population, 21,046 (37.56%) in 2020 Census
Gulfway
Orange - Black population, 6,795 (35.16%) in 2020 Census

Central Texas - Waco-College Station area.
 Bryan - Black population, 12,876 (15.33%) in 2020 Census
 Calvert - Black population, 482 (50.10%) in 2020 Census
 Navasota - Black population, 2,018 (26.40%) in 2020 Census
 Waco - Black population, 26,844 (19.38%) in 2020 Census
 East Waco

Corpus Christi Texas, Nueces County
 Bay Area, Corpus Christi
 Calallen, Corpus Christi
 Mustang-Padre Island, Corpus Christi
 Northwest, Corpus Christi
 South Side, Corpus Christi

Dallas-Fort Worth Metroplex

Dallas 
 North east Dallas
 Oak Cliff
 Pleasant Grove
 South Dallas 
 Skillman Road
 West Dallas.
 Old East Dallas
 Hamilton Park
 Arlington Park
 Vickery Meadow
 South Fergusun
 Love Field Area

Dallas County
 Cedar Hill - Black population, 25,790 (52.47%) in 2020 Census
 DeSoto - Black population, 38,971 (69.41%) in 2020 Census
 Duncanville - Black population, 12,085 (29.69%) in 2020 Census
 Grand Prairie - Black population, 46,360 (23.64%) in 2020 Census
 Irving - Black population, 31,714 (12.36%) in 2020 Census
 Lancaster - Black population, 27,078 (65.60%) in 2020 Census

Fort Worth
 Como
 Stop Six
 Woodhaven
 Meadowbrook
 Eastwood
 Poly
 Northbrook
Tarrant County
 Arlington - Black population, 88,230 (22.38%) in 2020 Census
 Mansfield - Black population, 15,539 (21.40%) in 2020 Census
 Euless - Black population, 9,626 (15.77%) in 2020 Census
 Forest Hill - Black population, 5,490 (39.34%) in 2020 Census
 Bedford - Black population, 5,693 (11.40%) in 2020 Census
 Hurst - Black population, 3,996 (9.89%) in 2020 Census

East Texas has some Black majority towns. Also known as the Big Thicket, and Piney Woods region
 Ames - Black population, 700 (74.71%) in 2020 Census
 Athens - Black population, 2,059 (16.01%) in 2020 Census
 Browndell - Black population, 78 (48.75%) in 2020 Census
 Cuney - Black population, 69 (59.48%) in 2020 Census
 Domino - Black population, 59 (83.10%) in 2020 Census
 Goodlow - Black population, 133 (74.70%) in 2020 Census
 Huntsville - Black population, 11,420 (24.86%) in 2020 Census
 Phelps
 Jasper - Black population, 3,101 (45.45%) in 2020 Census
 Lufkin - Black population, 9,045 (26.49%) in 2020 Census
 Nacogdoches - Black population, 8,376 (26.06%) in 2020 Census
 San Augustine - Black population, 968 (50.42%) in 2020 Census
 Seven Oaks - Black population, 28 (41.20%) in 2020 Census

Houston
 Acres Homes
 Alief
 Bammel
 Bordersville
 Brays Oaks
 Clinton Park
 Cloverland
 Cypress Station
 Fifth Ward
 Fourth Ward
 Frenchtown
 Greenspoint
 Herschelwood
 Hiram Clarke
 Homestead
 Imperial Valley
 Independence Heights – Studewood
 Inwood Forest
 Kashmere Gardens
 Lakewood
 North Houston
 Rosewood
 Sharpstown
 South Park
 Southwest Houston
 Settegast
 Southside
 Sunnyside
 Trinity Garden
 Third Ward
 Westfield
 Yellowstone

Houston Suburbs
 Barrett - Black population, 2,324 (44.50%) in 2020 Census
 Baytown - Black population, 13,652 (16.31%) in 2020 Census
 Conroe - Black population, 8,951 (9.95%) in 2020 Census
 Freeport - Black population, 13,690 (55.91%) in 2020 Census
 Fresno - Black population, 2,426 (17.33%) in 2020 Census
 Galveston - Black population, 8,785 (16.36%) in 2020 Census
 Hempstead - Black population, 1,760 (32.41%) in 2020 Census
 Kendleton - Black population, 220 (64.10%) in 2020 Census
 Manvel - Black population, 2,661 (26.63%) in 2020 Census
 Missouri City - Black population, 30,146 (40.6%) in 2020 Census
 Prairie View - Black population, 6,712 (82.01%) in 2020 Census
 Spring, Texas - Black population, 15,492 (24.76%) in 2020 Census
 Pearland, Texas - Black population, 24,482 (19.46%) in 2020 Census
 Tamina
 Waller - Black population, 458 (17.08%) in 2020 Census
 Willis - Black population, 1,076 (16.73%) in 2020 Census

Killeen-Temple (Bell County)
 Killeen - Black population, 54,109 (35.34%) in 2020 Census
 Temple - Black population, 12,031 (14.66%) in 2020 Census
 Harker Heights - Black population, 7,198 (21.75%) in 2020 Census
 Copperas Cove - Black population, 6,431 (17.54%) in 2020 Census
 Fort Hood - Black population, 4,521 (16.00%) in 2020 Census

Northeast Texas
 Corsicana - Black population, 4,782 (19.04%) in 2020 Census
 Easton - Black population, 259 (51.9%) in 2020 Census
 Henderson - Black population, 3,052 (23.0%) in 2020 Census
 Jacksonville - Black population, 2,747 (19.63%) in 2020 Census
 Longview - Black population, 19,173 (23.49%) in 2020 Census
 Marshall - Black population, 8,368 (35.77%) in 2020 Census
 Mexia - Black population, 2,086 (30.26%) in 2020 Census
 Moore Station - Black population, 142 (88.75%) in 2020 Census
 Neylandville - Black population, 29 (43.28%) in 2020 Census
 Palestine - Black population, 4,439 (23.94%) in 2020 Census
 Scottsville - Black population, 138 (41.30%) in 2020 Census
 Texarkana - Black population, 13,565 (37.48%) in 2020 Census
 Toco - Black population, 56 (61.54%) in 2020 Census
 Tyler - Black population, 24,126 (22.76%) in 2020 Census

San Antonio
 Ellis Alley
 Kirby
 Pecan Valley
 East Side, San Antonio
 North East
 Converse
 Dellcrest
 Eastwood
 Huntleigh Park
 Honey
 Lackland AFB

Wichita Falls

U.S. Virgin Islands 
Majority of territory residents are of black/Afro-Caribbean descent.

Utah 
Most of state's blacks concentrated in Hill Air Force Base near Ogden.

Historically, the diverse SugarHouse district of Salt Lake City.

Vermont
Burlington – Old North End 4.7%

Virginia
Alexandria – Black population, at 31,314 (19.64%) in 2020 Census.

Arlington County – Black population, at 20,330 (8.52%) in 2020 Census.

Arlington View
Nauck
Penrose
High View Park

Charles City County – Black population, at 2,836 (41.87%) in 2020 Census.

Charles City (50.96%)

Chase City - Mecklenburg County

Cheasapeake
 South Norfolk

Clarksville - Mecklenburg County

Courtland - Southampton County

Danville

Dendron (51.2%) - Surry County

Eastern counties of Virginia along Chesapeake Bay (Middle Peninsula).
It encompasses six Virginia counties: 
 Essex, 
 Gloucester, 
 King and Queen, 
 King William, 
 Mathews, 
 and Middlesex.

Emporia (56.2%) - Greensville County

Franklin (52.3%)

Hampton
 Aberdeen Gardens
 Shell Road

Hopewell

Kenbridge - Lunenburg County

Lawrenceville (64.6%) - Brunswick County

Lynchburg

Martinsville
 Laurel Park (64.4%)
 Sandy Level (73.3%)

Nassawadox (54.9%) - Northampton County

Newport News
 Christopher Shores-Stuart Gardens
 East End

Norfolk
 Berkley
 Huntersville
 Little Africa, aka Little Manila or San Juan.
 Park Place
 Youngs Park

Petersburg
 Ettrick (75.1%)

Portsmouth

Richmond - Henrico County
 East Highland Park (79.4%)
 Highland Springs (51.8%)
 Jackson Ward
 Montrose

Roanoke

Smithfield - Isle of Wight County
 Rushmere (62.1%)

South Boston - Halifax County

South Hill - Mecklenburg County
 Brodnax
 La Crosse

Suffolk

Wakefield (51.3%) - Sussex County

Waverly (61.8%) - Sussex County

Williamsburg

Virginia Beach
 Beechwood
 Gracetown
 Mill Dam
 Reedtown
 Seatack

Washington
Federal Way

Parkland
 Lake City
 Park Lodge (central area)

Seatac

Seattle
 Atlantic
 Central District
 Columbia City
 High Point
 International District (more Chinese and Asian).
 Leschi
 Rainier Beach
 South Side (near Safeco Field).
 Yesler Terrace

Tacoma
 Hilltop
 Salishan

Tukwila – est.15–20%.

West Virginia
Institute

Keystone

Kimball

Wisconsin
Beloit

Kenosha

Madison

Burke Heights
Burr Oaks
Nobel Park
Park Ridge
Walnut Grove
Wexford Ridge

Middleton

Milwaukee
 Ann Arbor
 Arlington Heights
 Avenues West
 Berryland
 Bronzeville
 Franklin Heights
 Grantosa Heights
 Havenwoods
 Harambee
 Hillside/Lapham Park
 Halyard Park
 Metcalfe Park
 Merrill Park
 Midtown
 North Division
 Parklawn
 Parkwest
 Rufus King
 Uptown
 Uptown Crossing
 Walnut Hill
 Washington Park
 Westlawn

Racine

Wyoming
Cheyenne

Rock Springs

Laramie

See also

 List of U.S. cities with large African American populations
 List of U.S. communities with African American majority populations
 List of U.S. metropolitan areas with large African-American populations
List of U.S. states and territories by African-American population
List of majority-Black counties in the United States

References

African American
Ethnic enclaves in the United States
African-American demographics
African American-related lists
Neighborhoods in the United States